The 2013–14 SPFL Under 20 League was the sixteenth season of the highest youth Scottish football league, the second season under the new under 20 format and the first season since the inception of the Scottish Professional Football League. It began in August 2013 ended in May 2014. Celtic won the league championship, one point ahead of nearest challengers Rangers.

Changes
This year the league was again expanded, this time from 15 teams to 16 teams. It retained 14 of the sides from the previous season, with newly promoted Scottish Premiership club Partick Thistle replacing relegated Dundee. Scottish League One side Rangers also returned to the league.

League table

Matches
Teams played each other twice, once at home, once away.

Top scorers

References

External links
https://web.archive.org/web/20130805115826/http://spfl.co.uk/reserve-and-youth/

Under
U20
SPFL Development League